Arshile Gorky (born Vostanik Manoug Adoian, ; April 15, 1904 – July 21, 1948) was an Armenian-American painter who had a seminal influence on Abstract Expressionism. He spent the last years of his life as a national of the United States. Along with Mark Rothko, Jackson Pollock and Willem de Kooning, Gorky has been hailed as one of the most powerful American painters of the 20th century. The suffering and loss he experienced in the Armenian genocide had crucial influence at Gorky’s development as an artist.

Early life

Gorky was born in the village of Khorgom (today's Dilkaya), situated on the shores of Lake Van in the Ottoman Empire (modern-day Turkey). His birthdate is often cited as April 15, 1904, but the year might have been 1902 or 1903. Toward the end of his life, he was particularly vague about his date of birth, changing it from year to year. In 1908, his father emigrated to America to avoid the draft, leaving his family behind in the town of Van. He settled in Providence, Rhode Island.

In 1915, Gorky fled Lake Van during the Armenian genocide and escaped with his mother and three sisters into Russian-controlled territory. In the aftermath of the genocide, Gorky's mother died of starvation in Yerevan in 1919. Arriving in America in 1920, the 16-year-old Gorky was reunited with his father, but they never grew close.

In the process of reinventing his identity, he changed his name to "Arshile Gorky", claiming to be a Georgian noble (taking the Georgian name Arshile/Archil), and even telling people he was a relative of the Russian writer Maxim Gorky.

Career

In 1923, Gorky enrolled in the recently founded New England School of Art in Boston, eventually becoming a part-time instructor.  During the early 1920s he was influenced by Impressionism, although later in the decade he produced works that were more postimpressionist.  During this time he was living in New York and was influenced by Paul Cézanne.  In 1925 he was asked by Edmund Greacen of the Grand Central Art Galleries to teach at the Grand Central School of Art; Gorky accepted and remained with them until 1931. His notable students included Revington Arthur.

In 1927, Gorky met Ethel Kremer Schwabacher and developed a lifelong friendship. Schwabacher was his first biographer. Gorky said:
The stuff of thought is the seed of the artist. Dreams form the bristles of the artist's brush. As the eye functions as the brain's sentry, I communicate my innermost perceptions through the art, my worldview.

In 1931, Gorky sent  a group of works ranging in price from $100 to $450 to the Downtown Gallery in New York. (The artist's name was spelled "Archele Gorki" in the gallery's records. Most of Gorky's works from this period were unsigned.) The exact nature of their relationship is unknown.  Mrs. John D. Rockefeller (Abby Aldrich Rockefeller) purchased from the gallery a Cézannesque still life by Gorky titled Fruit.  Gorky may have been introduced to the gallery owner by Stuart Davis who regularly exhibited there.

In 1933, Arshile Gorky became one of the first artists employed by the Works Progress Administration Federal Art Project. This later came to include such artists as Alice Neel, Lee Krasner, Jackson Pollock, Diego Rivera and Mark Rothko.

In 1935, Gorky signed a three-year contract with the Guild Art Gallery (37 West Fifty-seventh Street, New York). Co-owned by Anna Walinska and Margaret Lefranc, but funded and directed by Lefranc, the gallery organized the artist's first solo exhibition in New York, Abstract Drawings by Arshile Gorky.

Notable paintings from this time include Landscape in the Manner of Cézanne (1927) and Landscape, Staten Island (1927–1928).  At the close of the 1920s and into the 1930s he experimented with cubism, eventually moving to surrealism. The painting illustrated above, The Artist and His Mother, (ca. 1926–1936) is a memorable, moving and innovative portrait.  His The Artist and His Mother paintings are based on a childhood photograph taken in Van in which he is depicted standing beside his mother. Gorky made two versions; the other is in the National Gallery of Art Washington, DC. The painting has been likened to Ingres for simplicity of line and smoothness, to Egyptian Funerary art for pose, to Cézanne for flat planar composition, to Picasso for form and color.

Nighttime, Enigma, Nostalgia (1930–1934) are the series of complex works that characterize this phase of his painting. The canvas Portrait of Master Bill  appears to depict Gorky's friend, Willem de Kooning. De Kooning said: "I met a lot of artists — but then I met Gorky ... He had an extraordinary gift for hitting the nail on the head; remarkable. So I immediately attached myself to him and we became very good friends. It was nice to be foreigners meeting in some new place." However recent publications contradict the claim that the painting is of de Kooning but is actually a portrait of a Swedish carpenter Gorky called Master Bill who did some work for him in exchange for Gorky giving him art lessons.

When Gorky showed his new work to André Breton in the 1940s, after seeing the new paintings and in particular The Liver Is the Cock's Comb, Breton declared the painting to be "one of the most important paintings made in America" and he stated that Gorky was a Surrealist, which was Breton's highest compliment. The painting was shown in the Surrealists' final show at the Galérie Maeght in Paris in 1947.

Michael Auping, a curator at the Modern Art Museum in Fort Worth, saw in the work a "taut sexual drama" combined with nostalgic allusions to Gorky's Armenian past.  The work in 1944 shows his emergence in the 1940s from the influence of Cézanne and Picasso into his own style, and is perhaps his greatest work. It is over six feet high and eight feet wide, depicting "an abstract landscape filled with watery plumes of semi-transparent color that coalesce around spiky, thorn like shapes, painted in thin, sharp black lines, as if to suggest beaks and claws."

Personal life
Artist Corinne Michelle West was Gorky's muse and probably his lover, although she refused to marry him when he proposed several times.

In 1941, Gorky met and married Agnes Ethel Magruder (maiden; 1921–2013) daughter of Admiral John Holmes Magruder, Jr. (1889–1963). Gorky soon nicknamed her "Mougouch", an Armenian term of endearment. They had two daughters, Maro and Yalda (renamed Natasha some months later). Maro Gorky became a painter, and married the British sculptor and writer Matthew Spender, son of the poet Sir Stephen Spender.

From 1946, Gorky suffered a series of crises: his studio barn burned down (destroying his library and thirty of his paintings); he underwent a colostomy for cancer; Mougouch had an affair with Roberto Matta. In 1948, Gorky's neck was broken and his painting arm temporarily paralyzed in a car accident, and his wife left him, taking their children with her. She was later married to British writer Xan Fielding.

On July 21, 1948, after telling a neighbor and one of his students that he was going to kill himself, Gorky was found hanged in his barn studio. On a nearby wooden crate he had written "Goodbye My Loveds". Gorky is buried in North Cemetery in Sherman, Connecticut.

Legacy

Gorky's contributions to American and world art are difficult to overestimate. His work as lyrical abstraction was a "new language. He "lit the way for two generations of American artists". The painterly spontaneity of mature works like The Liver is the Cock's Comb (1944),  One Year the Milkweed (1944), and The Betrothal II (1947) immediately prefigured Abstract expressionism, and leaders in the New York School have acknowledged Gorky's considerable influence. Arshile Gorky had a distinct, signature style and was known for his draftsmanship. He used twisted but elegant lines to bring in 'biomorphic' forms in his abstract paintings along with an overlay of colours to create a complex landscape of lines and colours on the canvas.

His oeuvre synthesizes Surrealism and the sensuous color and painterliness of the School of Paris with his own highly personal formal vocabulary. His paintings and drawings hang in every major American museum including  the National Gallery of Art, the Museum of Modern Art, the Art Institute of Chicago, the Metropolitan, Jordan Schnitzer Museum of Art in Eugene, and the Whitney Museum of American Art in New York (which maintains the Gorky Archive), and in many worldwide, including the Tate in London.

A selection of Gorky's letters were translated and published by Karlen Mooradian in Arshile Gorky Adoian and The Many Worlds of Arshile Gorky in 1980. Matthew Spender (1999) and Nouritza Matossian (2000) concluded from their research that the translations of Gorky’s letters to his younger sister, Vartoosh, published by her son, Mooradian, had been embellished and some of these letters were fabricated by Mooradian. The most accurate translations of Gorky’s letters to family and friends were published at Goats on the Roof: A Life in Letters and Documents (2009), edited by Spender with translations by Father Krikor Maksoudian.

Fifteen of Gorky's paintings and drawings were destroyed in the crash of American Airlines Flight 1 in 1962.

In June 2005, the family of the artist established the Arshile Gorky Foundation, a not-for-profit corporation formed to further the public's appreciation and understanding of the life and artistic achievements of Arshile Gorky.  The foundation is working on a catalogue raisonné of the artist's entire body of work.  In October 2009, the foundation relaunched its website to provide accurate information on the artist, including a biography, bibliography, exhibition history, and list of archival sources.

In October 2009 the Philadelphia Museum of Art held a major Arshile Gorky exhibition: Arshile Gorky: A Retrospective. On June 6, 2010, an exhibit of the same name opened at the Museum of Contemporary Art (MOCA) in Los Angeles. In 2021, during routine maintenance of "The Limit," a hidden painting was discovered underneath; both paintings were exhibited and included in the latest catalogue of his work.

In 2015 a fountain monument commemorating Gorky was erected in Edremit, a town near his birthplace. After the town's People's Democracy Party administration was replaced by government appointees the water supply to the fountain was cut off, the taps were broken off, and signs with Gorky's biography in four languages - Armenian, Kurdish, English and Turkish - were removed from the monument.

Art market
Gorky's estate has been represented by Hauser & Wirth since 2016. It previously worked with Gagosian Gallery.

In popular culture

Without Gorky is a documentary film about the artist, made by Cosima Spender, his granddaughter.
Kurt Vonnegut's novel Bluebeard (1987) briefly mentions Gorky.
Gorky appears as a character in Atom Egoyan's 2002 movie Ararat, as a child in Van and later as an adult survivor of the Armenian genocide living in New York.
Stephen Watts's poem The Verb "To Be" (Gramsci & Caruso, Periplum 2003) is dedicated to Gorky's memory.
Gorky appears as a character in Charles L. Mee's play about Joseph Cornell, Hotel Cassiopeia (2006).
"Tristes tropiques'", Hilton Als' first story in White Girls briefly mentions Gorky.

Bibliography

References

Further reading
Matossian, Nouritza (2001). Black Angel: The Life of Arshile Gorky. New York: Overlook Press. .
Meaker, M.J. (1964). Sudden Endings: 13 Profies in Depth of Famous Suicides. Garden City, NY: Doubleday & Company, Inc. p. 151–167: "The Bitter One: Arshile Gorky".
Rosenberg, Harold (1962). Arshile Gorky: The Man, the Time, the Idea. New York: Grove Press.
 Spender, Matthew (1999). From a High Place: A Life of Arshile Gorky. New York: Knopf. .
 Spender, Matthew (2009). Arshile Gorky: A Life Through Letters and Documents. London: Ridinghouse, London. .

External links

 Arshile Gorky at Gagosian Gallery
 
 Artcyclopedia
 Artnet – Arshile Gorky Art Images
 Arshile Gorky Biography: Hollis Taggart Galleries 
 Whistler House Museum of Art, Lowell, MA – Drawings & Paintings by Arshile Gorky: Mina Boehm Metzger Collection
 The Arshile Gorky Foundation – The official website for information on the artist
 

1904 births
1948 suicides
Abstract expressionist artists
Abstract painters
American portrait painters
20th-century American painters
American male painters
20th-century Armenian painters
Armenian portrait painters
Surrealist artists
Grand Central School of Art faculty
Federal Art Project artists
Armenians from the Ottoman Empire
Armenian genocide survivors
Emigrants from the Ottoman Empire to the Russian Empire
American people of Armenian descent
Artists who committed suicide
Suicides by hanging in Connecticut
Painters who committed suicide
1948 deaths
Soviet emigrants to the United States
20th-century American male artists